The Women's high jump event  at the 2005 European Athletics Indoor Championships was held on March 4–5.

Medalists

Results

Qualification
Qualification: Qualification Performance 1.95 (Q) or at least 8 best performers advanced to the final.

Final

References
Results

High jump at the European Athletics Indoor Championships
High
2005 in women's athletics